SMS Viper was a torpedo boat of the Austro-Hungarian Navy. Viper was built by the British shipbuilder Yarrow between 1895 and 1896 and formed the basis for the following s. She was renamed Torpedoboot 17 in 1910 and served through the First World War as a patrol boat and minesweeper. She was scrapped in 1920.

Design
In 1895, the Austro-Hungarian Navy purchased one prototype torpedo boat each from the British shipbuilder Yarrow and the German shipbuilder Schichau-Werke, two specialist builders of torpedo vessels.

Displacement was  normal and  full load. Two coal-fired Yarrow water-tube boilers fed a single three-cylinder triple expansion steam engine which drove a single propeller shaft.

The ships was armed by two  L/33 Skoda guns and three  torpedo tubes,  with two tubes forward on the sides of the ship, where they could fire almost dead ahead, and one on the ships' centreline aft. The ship had a crew of 21.

Construction and service
The Yarrow torpedo boat, named Viper, was laid down at Yarrow's Poplar, London shipyard in 1895, and launched in January 1896, earlier than the competing Schichau-built torpedo boat . She reached a speed of  during sea trials, and was completed in October 1896. While both torpedo boats had similar stability and seaworthiness, Natter suffered from vibrations at high speed, and the Yarrow design was chosen for further orders, with four ships of the slightly larger  ordered from Yarrow.

In 1910, Austria renamed most of its torpedo boats, with Viper becoming Tb 17. On the outbreak of the First World War Tb 17 formed part of the 21st Torpedo boat Group of the 11th Torpedo Craft Division, a local defence force based at Cattaro, and was still based at Cattaro on 20 March 1917, as a member of the 25th Torpedo boat Group of the 15th Torpedo Craft Division. She was employed as an escort and minesweeper during the war, and was allocated to France as a War reparation as part of the Treaty of Saint-Germain-en-Laye in 1919. She was scrapped in 1920.

Notes

Citations

References

 
 
 
 
 
 

Torpedo boats of the Austro-Hungarian Navy
World War I torpedo boats of Austria-Hungary
Ships built in Poplar
1896 ships